Accinctapubes albifasciata is a species of snout moth in the genus Accinctapubes. It was described by Herbert Druce in 1902, and is known from southern Mexico Brazil, Colombia, Bolivia, Ecuador, French Guiana, Guyana, Venezuela, Dominican Republic, and Trinidad.

The larvae feed on Persea americana and Ocotea veraguensis.

References

Moths described in 1902
Epipaschiinae
Moths of North America
Moths of South America